Electric Guitars were an English band formed early in 1980 by Neil Davenport (vocals, lyrics) and Richard Hall (bass, vocals) who were both studying English at Bristol University. The band soon increased to a five-man line-up, with Andy Sanders (guitar, vocals), Matt Salt (drums) and Dick Truscott (keyboards), they also later added two backing singers: Sarah and Wendy Patridge. Their first single "Health" / "Continental Shelf" was released on local label Fried Egg Records in 1980.

They contributed four live tracks to the first edition of The Bristol Recorder in 1980, and in 1981 released their second single "Work" / "Don’t Wake the Baby" on Recreational Records, which reached No. 45 on the UK Indie Chart. They toured as support to The Thompson Twins, which brought them to the attention of Stiff Records, who promptly signed them up.  The band's first single for Stiff was "Language Problems" in 1982, and this was followed by an EP in the same year, from which Toni Basil recorded "Beat Me Hollow" for her TV special. Bert Muirhead in his 1982 book about Stiff Records, said about the band, “The combination of Stiff, Martin Rushent and Worldchief Management (OMITD etc) seems unstoppable. They will undoubtedly be very big in the mid 1980s.” However, after the "Wolfman Tap" single on Naive Records, they disbanded in August 1983.

Trivia
The band sang and performed in a Japanese advert for Royal Dutch Shell, called Shell, We Shall.

Sarah and Wendy Partridge went on to sing with Shriekback.
The electric guitars also traveled with Peter Gabriel as his opening act during the Security tour.

Discography

Albums
Jolts (2008, Bristol Archive Records, UK, Download, ARC026)
Electric Guitars - The Stiff Recordings (?, Stiff, UK, Download)

Singles
"Health" / "Continental Shelf" (1980, Fried Egg, UK, 7", EGG 012)
"Work" / "Don't Wake the Baby" (1981, Recreational, UK, 7", SPORT 4)
"Language Problems" / "Night Bears" (1982, Stiff, UK, 7" BUY 148)
"Language Problems" / "Night Bears" / "Ex-US Presidents" (1982, Stiff, UK, 12" BUYIT 148)
"Language Problems" / "Night Bears" / "Ex-US Presidents" (1982, Victoria, Spain, 12", VIC-052)
"Beat Me Hollow" / "Genghis Khan" / "My Big Surprise" / "The Cupboard" EP (1982, Stiff, UK, 12", BUYIT 161)
"Wolfman Tap" / "Stamp Out The Termites" (1983, Naive Records, UK, 7", NAV 5)
"Wolfman Tap" / "Stamp Out The Termites" (1983, Naive Records, UK, 12", 12 NAV 5)

Tracks appear on
Fried Alive 1980 World Tour EP (1980, Fried Egg, EP)
The Bristol Recorder (1980, Wavelength, UK, LP/Magazine, BR001)
E(gg)clectic 1 (1980, Fried Egg, UK, LP, FRY 002)
Volume 6 Program 2 (1983, Disconet Program Service, USA, 12’’x2, MWDN 602)
The Stiff Records Box Set (1992, Demon Records, UK, CDx4, STIFF BOX 1)
Western Stars - The Bands That Built Bristol Vol. 1 (2001, Bristol Archive Records, UK, CD, ARC 001)
The Big Stiff Box Set (2007, Salvo, UK, CDx4, SALVOBX402)
E(gg)clectic 1 [Reissue] (2008, Bristol Archive Records, UK, Download, ARC 006)

See also
List of Bands from Bristol
Culture of Bristol
List of Record Labels from Bristol

References

External links
Listen to Electric Guitars at last.fm
[ Electric Guitars at Allmusic]
Band discography at Discogs.com
Electric Guitars at Reverbenation.com
Band discography from Bristol Archive Records
Band interview by Dave Massey (Taken from his Future Days Fanzine)

English funk musical groups
English new wave musical groups
English post-punk music groups
Musical groups from Bristol